Skolopoeis was a town of ancient Ionia. 

There was a sanctuary of the Eleusinian Demeter.

Its site is located near Doğanbey, Asiatic Turkey.

References

Populated places in ancient Ionia
Former populated places in Turkey